Alexander Ivanovich Tizyakov (10 December 1926 – 25 January 2019) was a Soviet economist and official. He was a member of the State Committee on the State of Emergency and served as President of the Association of State Enterprises at the time of the 1991 Soviet coup d'état attempt.

Early life and career 
Tizyakov was born in Novoye Ivanayevo on 10 December 1926. From 1943 to 1950, he served in the Soviet Army in which he participated in the Eastern Front and Soviet–Japanese War. From 1950 to 1953, he worked at Uralkhimmash as a mechanic and foreman. From 1953 to 1956, he was an instructor of the Sverdlovsk Regional Committee of the Komsomol and an organizer of the Central Committee of the Komsomol. In 1958, he graduated from the Ural Polytechnic Institute.

Career
By 1956, Tizyakov was employed at the Kalinin Machine-Building Plant. There, he was a technologist, secretary of the party committee (1962-1964), deputy chief engineer (1964-1974), chief engineer (1974-1977), general director (1977-1988), and general director-supervisor (1988-1991).

Tizyakov was President of the Association of State Enterprises from 1989 to 1991. In this position, he had the powers of Deputy Head of the Government of the USSR and was Vice President of the Scientific and Industrial Union (1990-1991). He was also a deputy of the Sverdlovsk Regional Council of the 19th (1985-1987) and 20th (1987-1990) convocations.

In July 1991, Tizyakov was one of twelve other public and political figures who signed the open letter "A Word to the People". He was a member of the State Committee on the State of Emergency from 18 to 21 August 1991. After that coup had collapsed, Tizyakov was arrested. He was released on recognizance not to leave in January 1993 and granted amnesty by the Russian State Duma in 1994.

Later life and death 
Tizyakov co-founded Antal (engineering) and the insurance company Northern Treasury, founded Vidikon (production of chipboard) and the company Fidelity (production of consumer goods). He headed the board of directors of the investment trust company New Technologies. He was President of the Russian-Kyrgyz enterprise Technology and scientific director of Nauka-93. He was a member of the Expert Council under the Government of the Russian Federation and a member of the Technical Council under the Governor of the Sverdlovsk.

Tizyakov died on 25 January 2019 in Yekaterinburg. He was buried at Shirokorechensky Cemetery.

Notes

References

1926 births
2019 deaths
20th-century Russian economists
21st-century Russian economists
20th-century Russian politicians
21st-century Russian politicians
People from Tatarstan
Expelled members of the Communist Party of the Soviet Union
State Committee on the State of Emergency members
Recipients of the Order of Lenin
Recipients of the Order of the Red Banner of Labour
Soviet military personnel of World War II